The Communist Party of Nepal (Manmohan) was a communist party in Nepal led by Man Mohan Adhikari, an erstwhile leader of the radical faction of the Communist Party of Nepal (CPN) who had taken part in organising the Central Nucleus (an attempt to rebuild the CPN). Since the breakup of the Central Nucleus in 1973, he had led his own group of followers but it was not until 1979 that they constituted themselves as a separate party. Until 1982, the party was known as the Communist Party of Nepal (Unity Conference).

In 1986, the party merged with the Communist Party of Nepal (Pushpa Lal) and formed the Communist Party of Nepal (Marxist).

See also
 List of communist parties in Nepal

References

Defunct communist parties in Nepal
Political parties established in 1979
1979 establishments in Nepal
Political parties disestablished in 1986
1986 disestablishments in Nepal